Lost in Love is a 2006 South Korean romance melodrama film starring Sol Kyung-gu and Song Yoon-ah (later they married ). Directed by Choo Chang-min, it follows the emotional paths of two college friends over their ten years of friendship.

Synopsis
Yeon-soo (Song Yoon-ah) and Woo-jae (Sol Kyung-gu) have been college and long time friends. Although Yeon-soo is secretly in love with Woo-jae, she is afraid to reveal it, and he is not attentive enough to sense it. When they meet again after ten years, however, Woo-jae has come to view their relationship differently.

Cast
 Sol Kyung-gu as Woo-jae
 Song Yoon-ah as Yeon-soo
 Lee Ki-woo as Sang-sik
 Lee Hwi-hyang as Yeon-soo's mother
 Jang Hang-sun as Uncle
 Ko Kyu-pil as Chang-geun

References

External links 
 
 
 

2006 films
2000s Korean-language films
South Korean romantic drama films
2000s South Korean films